Bakhadur Khurshedovich Sokolov (born 2 February 2000) is a Russian football player. He plays for FC Khimik-Avgust Vurnary.

Club career
He made his debut in the Russian Football National League for PFC Krylia Sovetov Samara on 17 October 2020 in a game against FC Volgar Astrakhan.

References

External links
 
 Profile by Russian Football National League

2000 births
Living people
Russian footballers
Association football midfielders
PFC Krylia Sovetov Samara players
FC Lada-Tolyatti players
Russian First League players
Russian Second League players